Rustomjee Academy for Global Careers is a private vocational education and training (VET) institute. The institute is located on four campuses across Dahanu, Thane, Bengaluru and Rishikesh in India. Established in 2008, Rustomjee Academy for Global Careers is one of the pioneer in Vocational Education in India.

History
Rustomjee Academy for Global Careers was established in 2008 as a corporate social responsibility initiative of the Rustomjee Group, a real estate developer in Mumbai. Since its inception, RAGC has trained over 1 lakh students.

Accreditation and partnerships
Rustomjee Academy for Global Careers is affiliated with Maharashtra State Board of Vocational Education Examination, Yashwantrao Chavan Maharashtra Open University, University of Wolverhampton and Pearson. The institute has also partnered with the National Skill Development Corporation.

Mission
Skill over 500,000 youth to be employable and coach them to become entrepreneurs.

Vision
To give a generation of Indian World-class skill-sets, go beyond mere employment opportunities, create an entrepreneurial spirit and promise them a better future.

Campus

RAGC Dahanu: It was started in 2012 and affiliated to Maharashtra State Board of Vocational Education Examination (MSBVEE) in 2013. The campus is expanded in 5 acres located in Dahanu East. It offers full-time / part time programs in automobile, electronics, business, construction, and hospitality management.

RAGC Thane: Founded in 2014, Thane campus of RAGC is located in the industrial zone of Wagle Estate. It offers Full-Time Programs in Automobile, Electrical, Construction, and Business and offers Part-Time Programs in Multi-Skill Technician – ELBS, Construction Site Supervisor, and Automotive Mechanic.

RAGC Bengaluru: Rustomjee Academy for Global Careers partnered with Prestige Group, as a part of Skill India Mission, to set up the Rustomjee Prestige Vocational Education and Training Centre in Bengaluru, in 2017. The campus offers corporate training to employees in Mechanical and Electrical sector. It also offers higher national diploma in construction and the built environment accredited by Pearson.

RAGC Rishikesh:  RAGC partnered with Shri. Swami Purnanand Vidya Niketan Samiti to start a centre in Rishikesh in 2018. It offers short term vocational training courses for Pastry Chef and Multi Skilled Technician.

Academic departments 
The institute has 4 academic departments offering certificate, diploma and degree programs. These are:

 Automobile Engineering Department
 Civil and Construction engineering Department
 Electronics and Tele-Communication Engineering Department
 Management & Entrepreneurship Department

Leadership

 Boman Rustom Irani, Chairman and managing director of Rustomjee Group
 Percy Chowdhry, Director of Rustomjee Group
 Kavi Luthra, Vice President of Rustomjee Academy for Global Careers

Awards and recognition

 Best Vocational Training Provider at UK-India Skills Forum Awards 2010 by FICCI and UK India Business Council
 Awarded A+ Grade by the Government of Maharashtra
 Best All India ITI in 2011–12 by Bombay Chamber of Commerce & Industry and the Directorate General of Employment & Training
 Best Regional – Western India in 2011–12 by Bombay Chamber of Commerce & Industry and The Directorate General of Employment & Training
 Excellence in Skill Development, CREDAI Conclave 2017–18
 Best initiative in vocational and skill training at National Education Awards 2017 – ABP News
 Finalists in The Times of India Social Impact Awards, 2011
Best Training Partner – RPL by Tourism and Hospitality Skill Council

Impact

Social 
Skill Cluster, a division of Rustomjee Academy for Global Careers was started in 2015 with an aim to take the benefit of vocational skills to the masses for immediate employment. Since its inception Skill Cluster has touched more than 40,000 lives and changed their ability to earn a better livelihood. Skill Cluster has been supported by National Skill Development Corporation, Maharashtra State Skill Development Society, Uttarakhand Skill Development Mission, Tourism Corporation of Gujarat Limited and Confederation of Real Estate Developers Association of India.

Corporate 
Rustomjee Academy for Global Careers Corporate Training Program was introduced to support industry members by providing gainful skill training to their existing/new employees to enhances their productivity and efficiency at work, resulting in financial gain. It aims to provide a supportive workplace for the employees promoting belongingness and job satisfaction. Over 300 employees have been upskilled under this program.

References

External links
 

Vocational education in India
Engineering colleges in Mumbai
Education in Thane
Education in Thane district
Private engineering colleges in India
Educational institutions established in 2008
Universities and colleges in Mumbai
Education in Mumbai
2008 establishments in Maharashtra
Hospitality schools in India